Princess Eyi (year of birth unknown - died 80 BC), was a Chinese princess, daughter of Emperor Wu of Han and sister of Emperor Zhao of Han.

Life
Her birth date and mother is unknown. She is foremost known for her political involvement, and figured in several well known conspiracies. When Emperor Zhao ascended to the throne, she became the grand princess and took tutelage of the emperor and the royal family, and the imperial palaces were run by her, as a result, she became influential in the world of Han court politics, to the extent that the most powerful ministers in the government; Huo Guang and Shangguan Jie respected and counted on her, even the latter sought her help in his conspiracies.

Role in the marriage of the Emperor

She was instrumental in bringing about the marriage between her brother the emperor and Grand Empress Dowager Shangguan. Lady Shangguan's father Shangguan An was a friend of Emperor Zhao's sister, Princess Eyi, and her lover, Ding Wairen (丁外人).  He encouraged Ding to persuade the princess on the soundness of the marriage.  He argued that the Shangguans' power would be firmer with the marriage, and that they could then help Ding legitimize his relationship with Princess Eyi.  Princess Eyi agreed, and later in 84 BC the young Lady Shangguan was created an imperial consort (with the rank of jieyu).  In 83 BC, she was created empress.

First conspiracy

The Shangguans, to show their appreciation to Ding for his role in facilitating the marriage between Empress Shangguan and Emperor Zhao, wanted to have him created a marquess, but this request was rebuffed by Huo, as were their subsequent efforts to have Ding made an important official. This caused Princess Eyi to resent Huos' power and influence. The Shangguans, Princess Eyi, Prince Dan of Yan, and Vice Prime Minister Sang Hongyang (桑弘羊) (who was resentful that his monopoly system, which he felt to be the key to sound finances for the state, was being dismantled), formed an anti-Huo conspiracy. In 80 BC, Prince Dan sent a report to Emperor Zhao, accusing Huo of improperly exercising imperial authority. The conspirators' plan was that as soon as Emperor Zhao authorised an investigation, Shangguan Jie and Sang would arrest and immediately execute Huo. However, after the report was given to Emperor Zhao, the 14-year-old Emperor Zhao took no action on it. The next day, he summoned Huo to the palace and exonerated him, reasoning that the actions that Huo was accused of had happened so recently that Prince Dan, a long distance away, could not have possibly known them, and therefore the report must have been false. At this point, the anti-Huo conspiracy was not discovered, but everyone was impressed with the wisdom shown by the young emperor.

Second conspiracy
Later that year, the conspirators tried again. Their plan was for Princess Eyi to invite Huo to a feast, and then to ambush Huo and kill him.  They would then depose Emperor Zhao and make Prince Dan emperor. (However, allegedly, the Shangguans conspired to have Prince Dan killed once he arrived in the capital and for Shangguan Jie to declare himself emperor.) The conspiracy was revealed by a servant of Princess Eyi, and the conspirators were arrested and executed along with their entire clans. Princess Eyi and Prince Dan committed suicide.

Archaeological finds
A section of the Juyan Bamboo Slips excavated in 1970 refers to a 'senior princess', which is widely believed to denote Princess Eyi. The slips describe that Princess Eyi committed suicide in 80 BCE and that her granddaughter later became Queen of Hejian.

In 2014, it was reported that the Shaanxi Archaeological Research Institute had excavated a large Han tomb in Huaxu Town, Lantian County, which belonged to Princess Eyi. The burial had originally been suggested to belong to Jing Ke, who attempted to assassinate King Zheng of Qin in 227 BCE. However, wuzhu coins found in the tomb were cast in the yuanshou period (122–117 BCE) of Emperor Wu of Han, while the bricks used for the tomb interior suggested a date prior to 74 BCE. Additionally, the height of the tomb fit the specifications for a member of the Han nobility, and the terracotta figures accompanying the burial were specifically used by the imperial house. Finally, researchers examined the deceased's bones and found that they belonged to an adult female, leading them to conclude that the tomb was that of Princess Eyi.

References 

1st-century BC Chinese women
1st-century BC Chinese people
80 BC deaths
Year of birth unknown
Han dynasty imperial princesses
Suicides in the Han dynasty
Coup d'état attempts in Asia
People convicted of treason
Daughters of emperors